Hamilton Park Community Houses are three historic homes located at New Brighton, Staten Island, New York.  The Pritchard House (66 Harvard Ave., c. 1853) is a large, 2-story "L" shaped brick building coated with rusticated stucco.  No 32 Park Place (c. 1865) is a 2-story, brick dwelling with a mansard roof.  It features an Italianate style cornice.  The Hamilton Park Cottage (105 Franklin Ave., ca. 1860s) is a -story red brick house.  It features central triple arched porch over the main entrance.

It was added to the National Register of Historic Places in 1983.

References

Houses on the National Register of Historic Places in Staten Island
Italianate architecture in New York City